The Ndop prison break occurred on July 28, 2018, when Ambazonian separatists broke into the Ndop central prison and freed 163 inmates.

Prison break 
Late in the evening, at least 50 separatist fighters stormed the premises of the Ndop central prison. They managed to outgun the guards who were on duty and brought down the prison gates, enabling 163 inmates to escape. Despite the arrival of reinforcements, Cameroonian forces were unable to prevent the separatists from burning down the prison. During the raid, the separatists seized weapons and ammunition from the prison before retreating.

Aftermath 
Immediately following the raid, Cameroonian forces launched a manhunt to catch the fugitives. However, many were able to hide in the crowd, making their re-arrest difficult. The raid was the first of its kind since the start of the Anglophone Crisis.

References 

Conflicts in 2018
2018 in Cameroon
Anglophone Crisis
Military history of Cameroon
2018 crimes in Cameroon